Steve Karmen (born January 31, 1937) is an American composer, most famous for several jingles. Among his better known works are the New York State song, "I Love New York", the jingle Here Comes the King for Budweiser, the Hershey's chocolate jingle The Great American Chocolate Bar, the Exxon Song Energy for a Strong America (1976), and Wrigley Spearmint Gum / Carry The Big Fresh Flavor (1973). He also composed several music scores for motion pictures including the Mamie Van Doren film The Candidate (1964), Teenage Mother (1967) and What Do You Say to a Naked Lady? (1970), and performed briefly as a Calypso singer, achieving some recognition in Trinidad during that time.  Karmen is the recipient of 16 Clio Awards.

Life and career
Karmen was born in the Bronx, New York. Steve was unique among jingle writers. Unlike other composers, who were paid a flat price for their jingles, Steve was the only one of his peers to receive royalties every time one of his jingles was performed on TV or Radio. His informal industry title "The King of Jingles" may have been given to him because of this extraordinary business ability to retain publishing rights.

He was born into a conservative family. His father was from Russia. Karmen grew up with Bobby Darin, and played with him in a band in the 1950s. They met while they were at the Bronx High School of Science. He played saxophone and guitar.

His wife died of colon cancer in 1973.  He is the father of three daughters.

As of 2007, he lives in Westchester, New York.

List of Jingles
This list of jingles by Karmen only includes those composed from 1968 to the beginning of 1980. (Karmen, 1980).

1968
 Breakaway In A Wide-Trackin' Pontiac
 Budweiser Beer / Bud Is The King Of Beers...But You Know That
 Your Next Car Is A Chrysler
 Beneficial Finance / At Beneficial (Doot! Doot!) You're Good For More

1969
 Plymouth Makes It
 There's Nothing Like The Face Of A Kid Eating A Hershey Bar
 Tijuana Smalls [cigarettes] / You Know Who You Are
 Nationwide Insurance / Call Nationwide, 'Cause Nationwide Is On Your Side

1970
 Chrysler Plymouth Comin' Thru
 The More You Know, The More You'll Want Delco
 Budweiser Beer / When You Say Budweiser, You've Said It All
 Falstaff Brewing Company / Falstaff Beer, For Guys Who Like It

1971
 Budweiser Beer / Here Comes The King
 Michelob Beer / The Michelob Drinking Song
 National Beer / The Land Of Pleasant Living
 Diet Rite Cola / Everybody Likes It
 U.S. Brewers Association / Pitch In To Clean Up America
 Beneficial Finance / It's Great To Know You're Good For More

1972
 General Tires / Sooner Or Later You'll Own Generals
 Budweiser Malt Liquor / The First Malt Liquor Good Enough To Be Called Budweiser
 Colt .45 Malt Liquor / A Completely Unique Experience
 Colt .45 Malt Liquor / You'll Be Sorry For All The Time You Wasted
 Fresca / Tastes Like A Soft Drink
 R.C. Cola / It's Right For You
 Doublemint Gum / Doublemint Will Do It
 Hush Puppies Are Dumb

1973
 Pontiac / Stand Up
 Sunoco Oil Corp. / I Can Be Very Friendly
 Juicy Fruit Gum / Let's Pick A Pack
 Wrigley's Spearmint Gum / Carry The Big Fresh Flavor
 Ozark Air Lines / We're Big On That

1974
 Cadillac - A Standard For The World
 Michelin Tires / We Made It First, We Make It Last
 Wrigley's Spearmint Gum / You'll Like The Big, Long-Lasting Flavor
 Buc-Wheats Cereals / Feelin' Like A Million Bucks
 Northwest Orient Airlines / We Give You Half The World
 Trans World Airlines / A Taste Of Europe—Trans World Service
 Dial Soap / Aren't You Glad You Use Dial
 Purina Cat Food / Purina In The Little Blue Can
 Scholl's Sandals / The Comfortable Life
 Michelob Beer / Weekends Were Made For Michelob

1975
 Farrell's Ice Cream Parlors / Farrell's Is Fabulous Fun
 Burry's Cookies / The Burry's Blues
 The Detroit News / You Haven't Read The Paper Until You've Read The News
 Great Adventure Amusement Park (now Six Flags Great Adventure) / The Greatest Day In Your Life

1976
 Exxon / Energy For A Strong America
 Prestone Anti-Freeze / You Know It Protects
 Midas Muffler / Don't Compromise, Midasize
 Anheuser Busch Natural Light [beer] / Won't Fill You Up, So It Won't Slow You Down
 Budweiser Beer / When Do You Say Budweiser?
 General Foods International Coffees / It's Our Flavor That Makes Us Special
 Sunbeam Bread / A Sunwich Is Better Than A Sandwich
 Southwestern Bell Telephone / What Else Is So Nice For The Price

1977
 Anheuser Busch Natural Light [beer] / Take A Natural Break
 Michelob Beer / Weekend Pops (instrumental) - based upon "Weekends Were Made For Michelob"
 Jack in the Box [restaurants] / Ji-Ji-Jack, Ji-Ji-Jack—Jack In The Box
 Tic Tac / It's Time For A Tic Tac
 (Hershey Is) The Great American Chocolate Bar
 New York Tourism / I Love New York

1978
 Michelob Light / Good Taste Runs In The Family
 Beneficial Finance / That's What It's All About

1979
 Ford, That's Incredible!
 Sunoco Is Making Every Drop Count
 Braniff International Airways / We Better Be Better
 Eureka vacuum cleaners / You and Eureka
 The Leukemia Society of America / We Care

1980
 Pabst Blue Ribbon Beer / Give That Man A Blue Ribbon

Discography (selective)
 "Freight Train" / "Mama Look a Boo Boo" - El Dorado 510 (1957)
 "Free Passes" / "Lost" - CUB 9059 (1960)
 "Breakaway" Part 1 / "Breakaway" Part 2 (Featuring Jimmy Radcliffe) - United Artists 50451 (1968) 
 "Moments" / "Moments" instrumental - United Artists 50534 (1969)
 "What Do You Say to a Naked Lady?" / "Too Bad You Can't Read My Mind" - United Artists 50636 (1970) 
 "You've Said It All" (Four Feeling) / "You've Said It All" (Tuba Version) - Audio Fidelity 171 (1971)
 "Everybody Likes It" / "The East Way" - Audio Fidelity 179 (1971)
 "I've Never Had The Time" / "37-21" - Audio Fidelity  (1972)

Bibliography
 The Jingle Man (1980). Hal Leonard Corporation, 
 Through the Jingle Jungle (1989). Billboard Books, 
 Me and Bobby D.: A Memoir (2003). Hal Leonard Corporation, 
 Who Killed the Jingle? - How a Unique American Art Form Disappeared (2005). Hal Leonard Corporation,

References

External links
 

1937 births
Living people
The Bronx High School of Science alumni
Jingle writers
People from the Bronx